Julie Robinson  may refer to:

Julie Robinson (curator), Senior Curator of Prints, Drawings & Photographs at the Art Gallery of South Australia
Julie A. Robinson, U.S. federal judge
Julie A. Robinson (biologist), NASA scientist
Julie Anne Robinson, film and TV director
Julie Martin (Neighbours) née Robinson (1964–1994), fictional character from the Australian soap opera Neighbours